List of adverse effects of ribavirin by frequency.

Very common (>10% frequency)

 Abdominal pain
 Anemia
 Anxiety
 Appetite loss
 Concentration impaired
 Depression
 Diarrhea
 Dizziness
 Dry mouth
 Dry skin
 Emotional lability
 Fatigue
 Fever
 Hair loss
 Headache
 Influenza-like illness
 Insomnia
 Irritability
 Itchiness
 Joint aches and pains
 Muscle aches and pains
 Muscle weakness
 Musculoskeletal pain
 Nausea
 Neutropenia
 Rash
 Rigors
 Shortness of breath
 Viral pharyngitis
 Vomiting
 Weight loss

Common (1-10% frequency)

 Arthritis
 Back pain
 Cardiac murmur
 Chest discomfort
 Chest pain
 Dehydration
 Feeling abnormal
 Flushing
 Hemolytic anemia
 Hepatomegaly
 Hyperbilirubinemia
 Hyperglycemia
 Hypertension
 Hyperthyroidism
 Hyperuricemia
 Hypocalcemia
 Hypotension
 Hypothyroidism
 Increased appetite
 Jaundice
 Leukopenia
 Lymphadenopathy
 Lymphopenia
 Malaise
 Micturition frequency
 Muscle spasms
 Neoplasm formation
 Pain in extremity
 Palpitation
 Peripheral edema
 Polyuria
 Tachycardia
 Thirst
 Thrombocytopenia
 Urine abnormality

 Gastrointestinal disturbances (including mouth ulcers, indigestion, diarrhea, constipation, etc.)
 Infections (including sinusitis, the flu, sepsis, UTIs, etc.)
 Neurologic disturbances (including memory loss, migraines, incoordination, sensory distortions, etc.)
 Psychiatric disturbances (including suicidal ideation and psychosis)
 Sexual disturbances (including erectile dysfunction, prostatis, amenorrhea, etc.)
 Skin disturbances (including acne, eczema, psoriasis, etc.)
 Upper respiratory tract disturbances (including nosebleeds, nasal/sinus congestion, etc.)
 Visual and hearing disturbances (including tinnitus, blurred vision, etc.)

Uncommon (0.1-1% frequency)

 Bone pain
 Diabetes mellitus
 Facial edema
 Heart attack
 Hypersensitivity
 Hypertriglyceridemia
 Immediately life-threatening psychiatric disturbances, including suicide attempts and hallucinations
 Mouth pain
 Neuropathy
 Pancreatitis

Rare (0.01-0.1% frequency)

 Arrhythmia
 Bipolar episode
 Cardiomyopathy
 Ischemic colitis
 Kidney failure or insufficiency
 Myositis
 Pneumonia
 Rhabdomyolysis
 Rheumatoid arthritis
 Sarcoidosis
 Seizures
 Serious eye complications
 Vasculitis

Very rare (<0.01% frequency)

 Aplastic anemia
 Cardiac ischemia
 Encephalopathy
 Erythema multiforme
 Life-threatening lung complications
 Liver failure
 Nephrotic syndrome
 Polyneuropathy
 Stevens–Johnson syndrome
 Stroke
 Suicide
 Toxic epidermal necrolysis
 Ulcerative colitis

Unknown frequency

 Anaphylaxis
 Angioedema
 Bronchoconstriction
 Facial palsy
 Hives
 Homicidal ideation
 Idiopathic thrombocytopenic purpura
 Mania
 Mental status change
 Mononeuropathies
 Pericardial effusion
 Pericarditis
 Periodontal disease
 Pure red cell aplasia
 Systemic lupus erythematosus
 Thrombotic thrombocytopenic purpura
 Vasculitis
 Vogt–Koyanagi–Harada disease

References

Ribavirin